Fort Belvoir  is a United States Army installation and a census-designated place (CDP) in Fairfax County, Virginia, United States. It was developed on the site of the former Belvoir plantation, seat of the prominent Fairfax family for whom Fairfax County was named.  It was known as Camp A. A. Humphreys from 1917 to 1935 and Fort Belvoir afterward.

Fort Belvoir is home to a number of significant United States military organizations. With nearly twice as many workers as The Pentagon, Fort Belvoir is the largest employer in Fairfax County. Fort Belvoir comprises three geographically distinct areas: main base, Davison Army Airfield, and Fort Belvoir North.

History

Plantation 

The Fort Belvoir site was originally the home of William Fairfax, the cousin and land agent of Thomas Fairfax, 6th Lord Fairfax of Cameron the proprietor of the Northern Neck, which stood on land now part of the base. William Fairfax purchased the property in 1738 when his cousin arranged for him to be appointed customs agent (tax collector) for the Potomac River, and William erected an elegant brick mansion overlooking the river, moving in with his family in 1740. Lord Fairfax came to America in 1747 and stayed less than a year at the Belvoir estate before moving to Greenway Court. The Fairfax family lived at Belvoir for over 30 years, but eldest son (and heir) George William Fairfax sailed to England on business in 1773, never to return. The manor home was destroyed by fire in 1783.

The ruins of the Belvoir Mansion and the nearby Fairfax family grave site are listed on the National Register of Historic Places.

Fort 

The post was founded during World War I as Camp A. A. Humphreys, named for American Civil War Union Army general Andrew A. Humphreys, who was also Chief of Engineers. The post was renamed Fort Belvoir in the 1930s at the request of Howard W. Smith, a Congressman from Virginia, in recognition of the Belvoir plantation that once occupied the site. The adjacent United States Army Corps of Engineers Humphreys Engineer Center retains part of the original name.

Camp Humphreys was established in World War I as the U.S. Army Engineers Training School. It served as the post-graduate institution for U.S. Military Academy engineers and a finishing school for engineering troops headed to war. The school, which came to host the Engineer Officer Basic Course, relocated in 1988 from Fort Belvoir to Fort Leonard Wood, in Missouri.

As a result of the 2005 Base Realignment and Closure Commission, a substantial number of personnel were transferred to Fort Belvoir, and others were civilians employed there.  All major Washington, D.C.-area National Geospatial-Intelligence Agency (NGA) facilities, including those in Bethesda, MD, Reston, VA, and Washington, D.C. were consolidated at a new facility, the NGA Campus East, situated on the former Engineer Proving Ground site. The cost of the new center was $2.4 billion.

The Army Historical Foundation announced in March 2017, its intent to begin the construction of the National Museum of the United States Army at Fort Belvoir. The  museum will feature historical galleries, an "interactive Experiential Learning Center" and the Army Theater. There will also be outdoor venues including a Memorial Garden, Amphitheater, Parade Ground, and Army Trail. It opened to the public on November 11, 2020.

Units and agencies 
Fort Belvoir serves as the headquarters for the Defense Logistics Agency, the Defense Acquisition University, the Defense Contract Audit Agency, the Defense Technical Information Center, the United States Army Intelligence and Security Command, the United States Army Military Intelligence Readiness Command, the Missile Defense Agency, the Defense Threat Reduction Agency, and the National Geospatial-Intelligence Agency.

Fort Belvoir is home to the Virginia National Guard's 29th Infantry Division (Light) and elements of ten Army Major Commands; nineteen different agencies and direct reporting units of the Department of Army; eight elements of the United States Army Reserve and the Army National Guard; and twenty-six Department of Defense agencies. Also located here are the 249th Engineer Battalion (Prime Power), the Military District of Washington's 12th Aviation Battalion which provides rotary-wing movement to the DoD and Congress, a Marine Corps detachment, a United States Air Force activity, United States Army Audit Agency, and an agency from the Department of the Treasury. In addition, Fort Belvoir is home to National Reconnaissance Office's (NRO) Aerospace Data Facility-East (ADF-E).

Demographics 

Fort Belvoir is a census-designated place, consisting of the South Post and North Post and excluding Davison Army Airfield, the North Area, and the Southwest Area. Neighboring CDPs are Mount Vernon to the east, Woodlawn and Groveton to the northeast, Hayfield and Kingstowne to the north, and Franconia and Newington to the northwest. As of the census of 2010, there were 7,100 people, 1,777 households, and 1,700 families residing in the CDP. The population density was 809.9 people per square mile (312.7/km2). There were 2,018 housing units at an average density of 230.2/sq mi (88.9/km2). The racial makeup of the CDP was 54.9% White, 11.7% African American, 0.6% Native American, 12.5% Asian, 0.5% Pacific Islander, 2.5% some other race, and 7.3% from two or more races. Hispanic or Latino of any race were 23.2% of the population.

There were 1,777 households, out of which 80.4% had children under the age of 18 living with them, 82.2% were headed by married couples living together, 11.0% had a female householder with no husband present, and 4.3% were non-families. 4.1% of all households were made up of individuals, and 0.1% were someone living alone who was 65 years of age or older. The average household size was 3.80, and the average family size was 3.90.

In the CDP, the population was spread out, with 44.7% under the age of 18, 9.4% from 18 to 24, 38.0% from 25 to 44, 7.6% from 45 to 64, and 0.3% who were 65 years of age or older. The median age was 22.6 years. For every 100 females, there were 99.5 males. For every 100 females age 18 and over, there were 96.8 males.

For the period 2010 through 2014, the estimated median annual income for a household in the CDP was $73,942, and the median income for a family was $75,436. Male full-time workers had a median income of $47,188 versus $63,214 for females. The per capita income for the CDP was $22,956. About 2.0% of families and 2.6% of the population were below the poverty line, including 2.9% of those under age 18.

Climate 
The climate in this area is characterized by hot, humid summers and generally mild to cool winters. According to the Köppen Climate Classification system, Fort Belvoir has a humid subtropical climate, abbreviated "Cfa" on climate maps.

Name controversy  
In 2020, in the wake of the George Floyd protests and petitions to rename U. S. army bases with names related to the Confederacy, it was proposed that the fort be renamed as well.  While not named after a Confederate officer, it was renamed after a slave plantation that was once owned by prominent 18th century Loyalist land owner George William Fairfax. Representative Howard W. Smith, who requested the renaming, was an old-school Southern Democrat who was sympathetic to the then-popular Dunning School of history that revered the Confederacy, and resented a base in Virginia being named after a Union general (Andrew A. Humphreys).  Thus, the name of the base has been criticized as improperly nostalgic for slavery and the antebellum era. In June 2021, the fort was initially included in a list of military bases to be considered for renaming by a newly created Naming Commission. Later in March 2022, the Commission determined that Fort Belvoir did not meet the criteria provided in the 2021 National Defense Authorization Act for making a renaming recommendation. However, the Commission recommended that the Department of Defense conduct its own review of the naming of the fort based on results of the commission's historical research.

Notable people 

 Jackson Miles Abbott, United States Army officer, birdwatcher, painter
 Jesse Burch, actor
 Robert T. Connor, former Borough president of Staten Island
 Wayne Cordeiro, minister
 John Driscoll, actor
 John Ebersole, educator
 Timothy Flanigan, businessman and politician
 Gregory D. Gadson, Soldier, actor, and motivational speaker
 Lauri Hendler, actress
 Larry Izzo, football player and coach
 Kenneth Kronholm, soccer player
 Hal Linden, actor
 Leslie Marx, Olympic fencer
 Patrick Ness, author
 William Oefelein, astronaut
 John Lynch Phillips, astronaut
 David Rabe, playwright
 Ahtyba Rubin, football player
 Rolf Saxon, actor
 John Wasdin, baseball player
 Randy Wiles, baseball player
 Bill Willingham, comic book writer and artist
 Christopher Evan Welch, actor

See also 

 Army Gas School
 Accotink Bay Wildlife Refuge
 911th Engineer Company (Technical Rescue)
 Military District of Washington
 Intelligence and Security Command
 National Geospatial-Intelligence Agency
 DeWitt Army Community Hospital
 Belvoir Federal Credit Union
 SM-1 (former nuclear reactor)
 Tysons Corner Communications Tower

References

External links 

 Fort Belvoir official home page
 Fort Belvoir Installation Overview from ArmyUSA.org

United States Army posts
Training installations of the United States Army
Lockheed Martin-associated military facilities
Belvoir
Census-designated places in Fairfax County, Virginia
Unincorporated communities in Virginia
Census-designated places in Virginia
Washington metropolitan area
Virginia populated places on the Potomac River
Belvoir
National Register of Historic Places in Fairfax County, Virginia
Military installations established in 1917
1917 establishments in Virginia